Gabi Ngcobo is a South African curator, artist and educator. Currently she is the Curatorial Director at the Javett Art Centre at the University of Pretoria (Javett-UP).

Early life and education
Gabi Ngcobo was born in Umlazi, a district of Durban belonging to today's province KwaZulu-Natal.

Ngcobo studied Art History at the University of Durban-Westville. After completing her BA degree, she has worked at the Iziko South African National Gallery and the Cape Africa Platform in Cape Town, where she co-curated the Cape 07 Biennale in 2007 together with Jonathan Garnham. In 2010, she completed a Master in Curatorial Studies at the Center for Curatorial Studies at Bard College in New York.

Career
Since the early 2000s, Gabi Ngcobo has been involved in collaborative, artistic and educational projects. Together with Dineo Seshee Bopape and Sinethemba Twalo she was the founder of NGO - Nothing Gets Organised. NGO focuses on process and self-organisation that take place outside of predefined structures and contexts. In 2010 she established, along with other artists, curators, and writers, the Center for Historical Reenactments (CHR). The CHR responds and questions how historical legacies impact and resonate within contemporary art. The CHR was team-led with Kemang Wa-Lehulere and Donna Kukama, among others, and was part of the 11th Biennale de Lyon.

Ngcobo was co-curator of the 32nd São Paulo Biennial in 2016, which was presented at the Ciccillo Matarazzo Pavilion in São Paulo. In 2018 she curated the 10th Berlin Biennale for Contemporary Art in Berlin together with Nomaduma Rosa Masilela, Serubiri Moses, Thiago de Paula Souza and Yvette Mutumba. With Dr. Yvette Mutumba she also co-curated the exhibition A Labour of Love in 2015 as part of her residency at the Weltkulturen Museum in Frankfurt am Main.

Between 2011 and 2020 she was a lecturer at the Wits University School of Arts, in Johannesburg. Since 2021, she has been the Curatorial Director at the Javett Art Centre at the University of Pretoria (Javett-UP).

Publications 
 Gabi Ngcobo, Yvette Mutumba (ed.), A LABOUR OF LOVE. exhibition catalogue, Weltkulturen Museum, German and English, Kerber Art Verlag, ISBN 978-3-7356-0140-7.
 Gabi Ngcobo, Don't panic, English, Jacana Media, 2012, ISBN 978-1-9201-9637-0.

References

External links 
Gabi Ngcobo on WorldCat.
Center for Historical Reenactments

Bard College alumni
Living people
Place of birth missing (living people)
South African women artists
South African women curators
University of Durban-Westville alumni
Academic staff of the University of the Witwatersrand
South African curators
Year of birth missing (living people)